In medicine, clinophilia is a sleep disorder described as the tendency of a patient to remain in bed in a reclined position without sleeping for prolonged periods of time.

References 

Medical terminology
Sleep disorders